East Hartford High School is a public high school of the East Hartford, Connecticut Public Schools. East Hartford High Schools shares its campus and many of its programs with the Connecticut International Baccalaureate Academy (CIBA), an honors college-preparatory high school for grades 9–12.

History
Formerly George J. Penney High School, dedicated in 1962 and named for town public works director George J. Penney, Sr. In 1985, Penney High School merged with East Hartford High School.

Notable alumni

 John B. Larson, former Chairman of the Democratic Caucus of the United States House of Representatives, graduated in the class of 1967
 Diane Venora, actress and producer, graduated in the class of 1970
 Will Solomon, former NBA player and professional basketball player

References

External links 
 

Buildings and structures in East Hartford, Connecticut
Schools in Hartford County, Connecticut
Public high schools in Connecticut